Isabella, Isabel, Elizabeth or Elisabeth of Portugal may refer to:

 Elizabeth of Portugal (1271–1336), saint, queen consort of Portugal
 Isabella of Portugal, Lady of Viseu (1364–1395), natural daughter of King Ferdinand I of Portugal
 Isabella of Portugal, Duchess of Burgundy (1397–1471), daughter of King John I of Portugal and third wife of Philip the Good
 Isabella of Coimbra (1432–1455), queen consort of Portugal
 Isabella of Barcelos (1414–1476), also known as Isabella of Braganza, daughter of Afonso I, Duke of Braganza, wife of Infante John, Constable of Portugal
 Isabella of Portugal, Queen of Castile (1428-1496)
 Isabella of Viseu (1459–1521)
 Isabella, Princess of Asturias (1470–1498), queen consort of Portugal
 Isabella of Portugal (1503–1539). Regent of Spain. Infanta of Portugal. Holy Roman Empress, German Queen and Queen consort of Spain.
 Isabella of Braganza, Duchess of Guimarães (1514–1576), daughter of Jaime I, Duke of Braganza, wife of Infante Edward, 4th Duke of Guimarães
 Infanta Isabella Clara Eugenia of Spain (1566–1633), infanta of Portugal
 Isabel Luísa, Princess of Beira (1668–1690), infanta of Portugal
 Maria Isabel of Braganza (1797–1818), infanta of Portugal, consort Queen of Spain 
 Infanta Isabel Maria of Portugal (1801–1876), infanta of Portugal
 Isabel, Princess Imperial of Brazil (1846–1921)
 Isabel, Duchess of Braganza

See also
Isabella of Braganza (disambiguation)